The Borda is a legendary creature that belongs to the culture of the Emilia-Romagna and other areas of the Po Valley in Italy.

It is a sort of witch that appears, blindfolded and horrible, both at night and on foggy days and kills anyone who has the misfortune to meet her. It is a personification of the fear related to swamps and marshlands, and to ponds and canals, invoked by adults to scare children and keep them away from such potentially dangerous places.

Name 
The Borda, known by this name especially in Modenese, is also known as Bourda in Bolognese, Bùrda in Ferrarese, Bûrda or Burdâna in Emilian. The masculine form takes the name of Bordón in Parma, Bordö or Bordoeu in Milan (meaning Ogre), Bordò in Bormiese (with a generally derogatory connotation). In Milanese, as well as in the dialects Cremasco and Bormiese, the word borda means fog. In Bergamasque the name has the meaning fog as well as that of paper mask.

Some scholars of local folklore trace the etymology of the term Borda to the root "bor-" which can be traced back to Borvo, of Celtic mythology, who presided over thermal and spring waters, and would be found, in a vast area united by an ancient Celtic presence, in toponyms and terms related to the water element.

Origin and diffusion of the myth 

Italian

Emilian-Romagnol

English

Some lullabies in Romagnol are dedicated to the Borda, which kills children who are not good and do not want to sleep by strangling them with a lasso or a rope. Some scholars point out that this peculiar way of killing can be traced back to the human sacrifices practiced in ancient Germanic cults and would be known by the discovery, in some Danish and British peat bogs, of bodies of people suffocated with a rope tied around their neck and then drowned, such as the Tollund Man.

The legend of Borda is central to the novel Mal'aria by Eraldo Baldini, from which the  TV miniseries was created.

See also 

 Marabbecca
 Grindylow

References

Bibliography 
 
 
 
 
 
 

Italian legendary creatures
Female legendary creatures
Mythological aquatic creatures
Water spirits